Stewart Edward George Cron (born 7 July 1946) is a former New Zealand rugby union player. A flanker, Cron represented Canterbury at a provincial level, and was a member of the New Zealand national side, the All Blacks, on their 1976 tour to South America. On that tour he played six matches for the All Blacks, including the two unofficial tests against Argentina.

References

1946 births
Living people
People from Hokitika
New Zealand rugby union players
New Zealand international rugby union players
Canterbury rugby union players
Rugby union flankers